Turkey competed at the 2012 Winter Youth Olympics in Innsbruck, Austria from January 13 to January 22, 2012.

Competitors

Alpine skiing

Turkey qualified 2 athletes.

Boys

Girls

Cross-country skiing

Turkey qualified 1 athlete.

Boys

Sprint

Ski jumping

Turkey qualified 1 athlete.

Boys

See also
Turkey at the 2012 Summer Olympics

References

2012 in Turkish sport
Nations at the 2012 Winter Youth Olympics
Winter 2012